Xuanwang Temple, formerly known as Yunti Academy, is a temple in Xihu Township, Miaoli County, Taiwan. Established in 1829 as the first privately-owned school (known as a shuyuan) in Miaoli, it was subsequently converted into a temple of Confucius under pressure from the Japanese government. In the temple, a tower for joss paper named Jingshengting and a Tudigong shrine are protected as county-level historic buildings.

History 
In 1829, Liu En-quan (劉恩寬) moved from Hui'an County in Fujian to Xihu. Liu established Yunti Academy at the current site of Ruihu Elementary school, making it the first shuyuan in Miaoli. In 1840, he moved the shuyuan to its current site, where he also set up shrines for Confucius and the five major literary gods (Wenchang Wang, Kui Xing, Guan Yu, and Lü Dongbin).

After Taiwan was ceded to Japan in the 1985 Treaty of Shimonoseki, the Japanese government pressured private shuyuan to close in favor of Japanese education. In 1900, Yunti Academy closed and the building was turned into a Confucian temple named Xiusheng Temple (修省堂), but still served as a meeting place for local scholars. In 1976, the temple was rebuilt and renamed to Xuanwang Temple.

Protected structures 

On 21 October 2010, the Miaoli County Government protected two structures within Xuanwang Temple:

Jingshengting 
Jingshengting is a sandstone furnace to burn joss paper. The structure is approximately three meters tall composed of a foundation, a hole for joss paper, and a shrine to Cangjie on top. This type of structure is known as a "cherish words tower" (惜字塔) which were built because in the past, people considered it a privilege to be educated.

Tudigong shrine 
The Tudigong shrine is located directly adjacent to Jingshengting. It is a small, rectangular shrine also carved out of sandstone. Inside, a stone table is placed engraved with "Fu De Zheng Shen", a formal honorary title for Tudigong.

References 

1840 establishments in Taiwan
Religious buildings and structures completed in 1840
Temples in Miaoli County
Historic sites in Taiwan
Taoist temples in Taiwan